Vítor Almeida (born 6 March 1970) is a Portuguese middle-distance runner. He competed in the men's 3000 metres steeplechase at the 1996 Summer Olympics.

References

External links

1970 births
Living people
Athletes (track and field) at the 1996 Summer Olympics
Portuguese male middle-distance runners
Portuguese male steeplechase runners
Olympic athletes of Portugal